Teisen is a neighborhood in the borough of Alna in Oslo, Norway.

It was a residential area in the 19th century, but from the 1950s it was built up with apartment blocks.

References

Neighbourhoods of Oslo